Jorge Vieira may refer to:
Jorge Vieira (footballer, born 1898), Portuguese footballer
Jorge Vieira (Brazilian footballer) (born 1934), Brazilian footballer
Jorge Vieira (footballer, born 1991), Portuguese footballer